= Mesquite Hills, El Paso, Texas =

Mesquite Hills
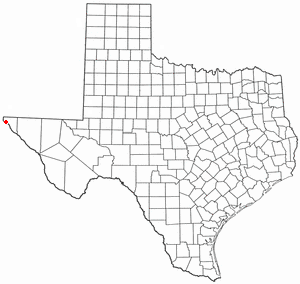
- Location in the state of Texas
- Coordinates: 31.957°N 106.370°W
- Country: United States
- State: Texas
- County: El Paso County
- City: El Paso
- Elevation: 3,600 ft (1,100 m)
- Time zone: UTC-6 (MDT)
  - Summer (DST): UTC-6 (CDT)

Mesquite Hills is a neighborhood in Northeast El Paso, Texas. Mesquite Hills is serviced by the Ysleta Independent School District. The community's schools are currently zones within the Parkland High School, Parkland Middle School, and Desertaire Elementary School boundaries.
